The 1954–55 Yugoslav Ice Hockey League season was the 13th season of the Yugoslav Ice Hockey League, the top level of ice hockey in Yugoslavia. Six teams participated in the league, and Partizan won the championship.

Standings

Partizan
Zagreb
Ljubljana
Mladost
Red Star
Papirničar Vevče

References

External links
Yugoslav Ice Hockey League seasons

Yugo
Yugoslav Ice Hockey League seasons
1954–55 in Yugoslav ice hockey